Palos Blancos is a rural barrio in the municipality of Corozal, Puerto Rico. Its population in 2010 was 3,458.

Features and demographics
Palos Blancos has  of land area and no water area.

History
Puerto Rico was ceded by Spain in the aftermath of the Spanish–American War under the terms of the Treaty of Paris of 1898 and became an unincorporated territory of the United States. In 1899, the United States Department of War conducted a census of Puerto Rico finding that the population of Palos Blancos barrio was 1,367.

Monte Choca State Forest
Located in Palos Blancos barrio is Monte Choca State Forest which was declared a state forest with law # 295 on November 21, 2003. Its area is about 244.76 acres and it is located at one of the highest elevations in Corozal.

Sectors
Barrios (which are like minor civil divisions) in turn are further subdivided into smaller local populated place areas/units called sectores (sectors in English). The types of sectores may vary, from normally sector to urbanización to reparto to barriada to residencial, among others.

The following sectors are in Palos Blancos barrio:

Features
PR-803 is the main north-south road through Palos Blacos.

See also

 List of communities in Puerto Rico
 List of barrios and sectors of Corozal, Puerto Rico

References

External links
 
 

Barrios of Corozal, Puerto Rico